Thomas Matthews Rooke (1842, London – 1942, London) was a British watercolourist. He worked as a designer, as an assistant to other artists, and was commissioned by John Ruskin to make architectural drawings.

Life
Ruskin hired Rooke from Morris & Co. in 1879, and Rooke was still paid by him eight years later. In 1884 he was painting Italian architecture. Ruskin's project aimed to record threatened landscapes and buildings, and for it he also employed Frank Randal (1852–1917), and half a dozen others.

In parallel Rooke was a studio assistant to Edward Burne-Jones, during the period 1868 to 1898. He also did work for Sydney Cockerell and the Society for the Protection of Ancient Buildings; and exhibited at the Royal Academy and Grosvenor Gallery. He contributed a painting to an 1882 book Bedford Park, celebrating the then-fashionable garden suburb of that name.

Family
Rooke married Leonora Jane Jones; the wood-engraver Noel Rooke was their son.

Notes

External links

 More works by Rooke @ ArtNet
 Biographical notes @ Bonhams
 

1842 births
1942 deaths
20th-century English painters
19th-century English painters
English male painters
English watercolourists
English landscape painters
English designers
20th-century English male artists
19th-century English male artists